John Sobel (born February 15, 1964) is a former professional tennis player from the United States.

Career
Sobel was seen mostly on the doubles circuit. He appeared in three Grand Slam events during his career. In the men's doubles he played with Ville Jansson at the 1990 US Open and Slobodan Živojinović in the 1992 Australian Open. As a mixed doubles player he took part in the 1990 French Open, partnering Lise Gregory. On each occasion, Sobel and his partner were eliminated in the opening round.

The highlight of his career was winning the doubles title at the 1992 Maceió Open, with Gabriel Markus. He also reached the semi-final stage of four Grand Prix/ATP tournaments, Madrid in 1989 with Eduardo Furusho, Kiawah Island in 1990 partnering Sven Salumaa, Charlotte in 1991 with Jimmy Arias and Moscow in 1991 partnering Josef Čihák.

ATP career finals

Doubles: 1 (1 title)

ATP Challenger and ITF Futures finals

Doubles: 3 (2–1)

References

1964 births
Living people
American male tennis players
Tennis people from New York (state)